John B. Chase (October 7, 1872 - August 31, 1950) was an attorney who served as mayor of Oconto, Wisconsin and as a member of the Wisconsin State Senate.

Biography
Chase was born on October 7, 1872, in Logansport, Indiana. He attended the University of Pennsylvania.

Career
Chase, an adherent of progressive Senator Robert M. La Follette, defeated long-term incumbent state senator Timothy Burke in the 1924 Republican primary, and served as a member of the Senate from 1925 to 1928. Additionally, he was District Attorney of Oconto County, Wisconsin, City Attorney of Oconto, Wisconsin, Mayor of Oconto and Chairman of the Oconto County Republican Committee. Chase died in 1950.

References

People from Logansport, Indiana
People from Oconto, Wisconsin
Republican Party Wisconsin state senators
Mayors of places in Wisconsin
District attorneys in Wisconsin
Wisconsin city attorneys
University of Pennsylvania alumni
1872 births
1960 deaths
20th-century American lawyers
20th-century American politicians